Henry Philip Hope (8 June 1774, Amsterdam – 5 December 1839, Kent) was a collector of Dutch origin based in London. He was one of the heirs of the bank Hope & Co. without having been a banker himself but rather a famous collector of the arts and more particularly precious gems.

Origins
He was the son of Jan Hope and Philippina Barbara van der Hoeven and the youngest brother of Thomas Hope (designer) and Adrian Elias Hope.

He inherited a grand home on Duchess Street, Cavendish Square, London, that he kept from when his father died in 1831 until he sold it for demolition in 1851.

Collector

He was a prominent collector of gems, including the Hope Diamond (a blue diamond of ) and a large pearl of 1,800 grains (or 90 g) which still bear the name of Hope.  The catalogue of his collection was published by Bram Hertz shortly after his death.

The conditions for the acquisition of the blue diamond remain uncertain. The archives found at the National Museum of Natural History leave no room for certainty.  It may be possible that Henry Philip Hope acquired the French blue diamond after his flight in 1792.  Records reveal that Henry Philip Hope also bought a 137-carat sapphire that had previously belonged to the Ruspoli family of Rome which was confused until 2013 with Louis XIV's "Grand Saphir".  The Grand was of comparable weight, but has different facets (rhomboid instead of cushion).

Inheritance
When his brother, Adrian Elias Hope, died in 1834 with no wife or children, he inherited £500,000 (or £ in  currency).  

In his book on precious stones, the French mineralogist René Just Haüy cites Henry Philip Hope as one of the most distinguished patrons of the arts of his time. When he died in 1839, his collection was viewed as "...one of most perfect collections of diamonds and precious stones that has, perhaps, ever been possessed by a private individual..."

See also

List of pearls by size

Bibliography 
Notes

References
 - Total pages: 250 
 - Total pages: 400 
 - Total pages: 198   

1774 births
1839 deaths
Hope family 
Art collectors from Amsterdam
Art collectors from London
Dutch people of Scottish descent
Dutch emigrants to the United Kingdom